Auto Action is an Australian motorsport magazine. The first edition was published on 24 February 1971. It became part of Australian Consolidated Press and was included in its 2012 sale to Bauer Media Group. After unsuccessfully trying to sell the title, publication ceased after 1,668 issues in May 2016.

After a short layoff, the masthead was sold to Action Media Partners and publication resumed on 25 July 2016.

References

External links
National Library of Australia catalogue entry

ACP magazine titles
Auto racing magazines
Bauer Media Group
Magazines established in 1971
Magazines published in Melbourne
Automobile magazines published in Australia
Sports magazines published in Australia
1971 establishments in Australia